The 1967–68 NBA season was the Royals 20th season in the NBA and 11th season in Cincinnati.

Roster

<noinclude>

Regular season

Season standings

Record vs. opponents

Game log

Awards and records
 Oscar Robertson, All-NBA First Team

References

Sacramento Kings seasons
Cincinnati
Cincinnati
Cincinnati